The Very Merry Widows is a 2003 Franco-Belgian film directed and co-written by Catherine Corsini.

Plot
The film is a black comedy. Renée (Jane Birkin) is a wealthy widow several times over. When her orphaned granddaughter Laurence (Émilie Dequenne) turns up looking for a place to stay, she gives the naïve young woman some instruction on marriage to the rich and terminal as a means of self-enrichment. After trying a couple of local men, Laurence sets her sights on the insurance agent investigating her grandmother's latest loss, Thomas (Jérémie Elkaïm). Renée herself, on the other hand, finds herself falling in love: with Maurice (Pierre Richard).

Cast
 Jane Birkin as Renée
 Émilie Dequenne as Laurence
 Pierre Richard as Maurice
 Clovis Cornillac as Alexis
 Jérémie Elkaïm as Thomas
 Laurent Grévill as Jean-Daniel
 Amira Casar as Claudia
 Pierre Laroche as Georges

Reception
A reviewer in Variety called the film "jauntily amoral" while noting that other critics had judged it "lame and distasteful".

References

External links

2003 films
Films directed by Catherine Corsini
French comedy films
2003 comedy films
Belgian comedy films
2000s French-language films
French-language Belgian films
2000s French films